The huge moth family Noctuidae contains the following genera:

A B C D E F G H I J K L M N O P Q R S T U V W X Y Z

Rabila
Rachiplusia
Raclia
Radara
Raddea
Radinacra
Radinocera
Radinogoes
Radinotia
Radosa
Ragana
Raghuva
Ramadasa
Ramesodes
Ramopia
Ramphia
Rancora
Raparna
Raphia
Raphiscopa
Rasihia
Reabotis
Recoropha
Rectangulipalpus
Rectipalpula
Redectis
Redingtonia
Rejectaria
Rema
Remigia
Remigiodes
Renia
Renisania
Renodes
Renyigoga
Resapamea
Resperdrina
Rethma
Reticcala
Reticulana
Retusia
Rhabdophera
Rhabdotina
Rhabinogana
Rhabinopteryx
Rhaesena
Rhamnocampa
Rhangena
Rhanidophora
Rhapsa
Rhatta
Rhazunda
Rhesala
Rhesalides
Rhesalistis
Rhescipha
Rhiscipha
Rhiza
Rhizagrotis
Rhizedra
Rhizolitha
Rhizotype
Rhodina
Rhodochlaena
Rhododactyla
Rhododipsa
Rhodoecia
Rhodophora
Rhodosea
Rhodotarache
Rhopalognatha
Rhoptrotrichia
Rhosologia
Rhosus
Rhubuna
Rhyacia
Rhynchaglaea
Rhynchagrotis
Rhynchina
Rhynchodia
Rhynchodina
Rhynchodontodes
Rhyncholita
Rhynchoplexia
Rhypagla
Rhytia
Riadhia
Riaga
Riagria
Richia
Ricla
Rictonis
Rileyiana
Rimulia
Ripagrotis
Ripogenus
Ripolia
Ristra
Rivula
Rivulana
Roborbotodes
Rodriguesia
Rolua
Ronania
Roperua
Rororthosia
Roseoblemma
Rostrypena
Rothia
Rotoa
Rougeotia
Rougeotiana
Rowdenia
Ruacodes
Rubarsia
Rufachola
Rugofrontia
Rungsianea
Rusicada
Rusidrina
Rusina

References 

 Natural History Museum Lepidoptera genus database

 
Noctuid genera R